The Ace Attorney series of video games has had many soundtracks. This is a listing of this discography.

Gyakuten Saiban Yomigaeru Gyakuten Original Soundtrack

 is a soundtrack album featuring background music from the Nintendo DS version of the adventure video game Gyakuten Saiban (known internationally as Phoenix Wright: Ace Attorney), composed by Masakazu Sugimori and arranged by Akemi Kimura.

 Gyakuten Saiban - Prologue
 Courtroom Lounge ~ Beginning Prelude
 Gyakuten Saiban - Court Begins
 Cross Examination ~ Moderato 2001
 Logic and Trick
 Naruhodou Ryuuichi ~ Objection! 2001
 Cross Examination ~ Allegro 2001
 Pursuit ~ Cornered
 Confess the Truth 2001
 Suspense
 Pursuit ~ Cornered / Variation
 Jingle ~ It Can't End Here
 Investigation ~ Opening 2001
 Ayasato Mayoi ~ Gyakuten Sisters' Theme 2001
 Detention Center ~ Jailer's Elegy
 Itonokogiri Keisuke ~ Detective Itonoko, Pal
 Reminiscence ~ Heartbroken Mayoi
 Hoshikage Soranosuke ~ Age, Regret, Retribution
 Congratulations, Everyone
 Reminiscence ~ Light and Shadow of the Film Studio
 Warrior of Great Edo, Tonosaman
 Reminiscence ~ Case DL-6
 Investigation ~ Core 2001
 Reminiscence ~ School Trial
 Won the Case! ~ First Victory
 Gyakuten Saiban - End
 Gyakuten Sisters' Ballad
 Yomigaeru Gyakuten - Prologue
 Reminiscence ~ Case SL-9
 Houdzuki Akane ~ Gyakuten Sisters' Theme 2005
 Taiho-kun ~ I Want to Protect
 Zaimon Kyousuke ~ A Detective Without a Desert
 Ganto Kaiji ~ Swimming, Anyone?
 Yomigaeru Gyakuten - End

 Ganto Kaiji Sketch Mishiyoukyoku

Gyakuten Saiban + Gyakuten Saiban 2 Original Soundtrack

Gyakuten Saiban + Gyakuten Saiban 2 Original Soundtrack is a two-disc soundtrack album featuring music from the video game Gyakuten Saiban and Gyakuten Saiban 2 (known internationally as Phoenix Wright: Ace Attorney and Phoenix Wright: Ace Attorney – Justice for All respectively), composed and arranged by Masakazu Sugimori (Gyakuten Saiban) and Akemi Kimura (Gyakuten Saiban 2).

 Gyakuten Saiban - Prologue
 Courtroom Lounge ~ Beginning Prelude
 Gyakuten Saiban - Court Begins
 Cross Examination ~ Moderato 2001
 Logic and Trick
 Naruhodou Ryuuichi ~ Objection! 2001
 Cross Examination ~ Allegro 2001
 Pursuit ~ Cornered
 Confess the Truth 2001
 Suspense
 Pursuit ~ Cornered / Variation
 Jingle ~ It Can't End Here
 Investigation ~ Opening 2001
 Ayasato Mayoi ~ Gyakuten Sisters' Theme 2001
 Detention Center ~ Jailer's Elegy
 Itonokogiri Keisuke ~ Detective Itonoko, Pal
 Reminiscence ~ Heartbroken Mayoi
 Hoshikage Soranosuke ~ Age, Regret, Retribution
 Congratulations, Everyone
 Reminiscence ~ Light and Shadow of the Film Studio
 Warrior of Great Edo, Tonosaman
 Reminiscence ~ Case DL-6
 Investigation ~ Core 2001
 Reminiscence ~ School Trial
 Won the Case! ~ First Victory
 Gyakuten Saiban - End
 Gyakuten Sisters' Ballad

 Gyakuten Saiban 2 - Prologue
 Ringtone / Moroheiya Takamasa
 Courtroom Lounge ~ Another Prelude
 Gyakuten Saiban 2 - Court Begins
 Cross Examination ~ Moderato 2002
 Trick and Magic
 Naruhodou Ryuuichi ~ Objection! 2002
 Cross Examination ~ Allegro 2002
 Pursuit ~ Questioned
 Confess the Truth 2002
 Ringtone / Naruhodou Ryuuichi
 Pursuit ~ Questioned / Variation
 Jingle ~ Can't Sleep on a Night Like This
 Lock on the Heart (Psycho Lock)
 Investigation ~ Opening 2002
 Ayasato Mayoi ~ Gyakuten Sisters' Theme 2002
 Detention Center ~ Security Camera Elegy
 Village of Kurain
 Reminiscence ~ Scars Carved by Fire
 Eccentric
 Gorgeous!
 Tachimi Circus
 Congratulations Again, Everyone
 Reminiscence ~ True Pain
 Koroshiya Sazaemon ~ The Whim of a Murderous Gentleman
 Ayasato Harumi ~ With Hami-chan
 Investigation ~ Middle 2002
 Great Revival ~ Mitsurugi Reiji
 Hotline to Destiny
 Investigation ~ Core 2002
 Reminiscence ~ Tonosaman Ballad
 Great Revival ~ Karuma Mei
 Won the Case! ~ Another Victory
 Gyakuten Saiban 2 - End
 Prosecutor's Murmur ~ Until We Meet Again

Gyakuten Saiban 3 Original Soundtrack

Gyakuten Saiban 3 Original Soundtrack is a soundtrack album featuring music from the Game Boy Advance version of the video game Gyakuten Saiban 3 (known internationally as Phoenix Wright: Ace Attorney – Trials and Tribulations), composed and arranged by Noriyuki Iwadare.

 Gyakuten Saiban 3 - Prologue
 Courtroom Lounge ~ Unending Prelude
 Gyakuten Saiban 3 - Court Begins
 Cross Examination ~ Moderato 2004
 Naruhodou Ryuuichi ~ Objection! 2004
 Cross Examination ~ Allegro 2004
 Pursuit ~ Caught
 Confess The Truth 2004
 Pursuit ~ Caught / Variation
 Miyanagi Chinami ~ Distant Traces
 Godot ~ The Fragrance of Dark Coffee
 Jingle ~ Can't Go Back to Those Days
 Investigation ~ Opening 2004
 "Stolen Turnabout"
 Takabisha Department Store
 Detention Center ~ Elegy of the Detained
 The Phantom Kamen Mask ~ Please Listen!
 Hoshiidake Aiga ~ I Just Want Love
 Yahari Masashi ~ When Something Smells, it's Always Me
 "Turnabout Recipe"
 Trés Bien
 Igarashi Shouhei ~ A Painful Declaration and War Song
 Shibakuzou Toranosuke ~ Swinging Zenitora
 Reminiscence ~ I Blame You
 "Beginning Turnabout."
 Reminiscence ~ Shadow on Oboro Bridge
 Hazakurain
 Tenryuusai Elise ~ Gentle Melody
 Investigation ~ Middle 2004
 Reminiscence ~ The Bitter Taste of Truth
 Pursuit ~ Cornered 2004
 Won the Case!  Unending Victory.
 Gyakuten Saiban 3 - End
 Ringtone / Godot

Gyakuten Saiban 4 Original Soundtrack

Gyakuten Saiban 4 Original Soundtrack is a soundtrack album featuring background music from the video game Gyakuten Saiban 4 (known internationally as Apollo Justice: Ace Attorney), composed and arranged by Toshihiko Horiyama.

 Gyakuten Saiban 4 ~ Prologue
 Courtroom Lounge ~ A New Prelude
 Gyakuten Saiban 4 ~ Court Begins
 Cross Examination ~ Moderato 2007
 Trance Logic
 Housuke Odoroki ~ Start of a New Trial!
 Cross Examination ~ Allegro 2007
 Confess the Truth 2007
 Thrill Theme ~ Suspense
 Perceive ~ Surging Eyes
 Pursuit ~ You Must Corner It
 Jingle ~ Enough For Today
 Minuki ~ Magical Child
 Kyouya Garyuu ~ LOVE LOVE GUILTY
 Akane Houdzuki
 Investigation ~ Opening 2007
 Detention Center ~ Tragicomical Meeting
 Turnabout Street Corners
 Eccentric 2007
 Kitakitsune Family
 Ringtone / LOVE LOVE GUILTY
 Reminiscence ~ Damaged Foxes
 Serenade of a Guitar in Love
 Arumajiki Family
 Reminiscence ~ Fate Covered in Tricks and Devices
 Lamiroir ~ Sight-Seeing Music
 "Turnabout Inheritor"
 Psycho Lock 2007
 Doburoku Studio
 Solitary Confinement ~ Theme of Darkness
 Investigation ~ Core 2007
 Reminiscence ~ The Forgotten Legend
 Won the Case! ~ Our victory
 Gyakuten Saiban 4 ~ End

Gyakuten Kenji Original Soundtrack

The Gyakuten Kenji Original Soundtrack is a two-disc soundtrack album featuring background music from the video game Gyakuten Kenji (known internationally as Ace Attorney Investigations: Miles Edgeworth).  Music is composed by Noriyuki Iwadare and Yasuko Yamada.

 Gyakuten Kenji - Prologue
 Investigation ~ Opening 2009
 Investigation ~ Middlegame 2009
 Investigation ~ Contradiction at the Crime Scene
 Logic ~ The Way to the Truth
 Investigation ~ Core 2009
 Confrontation ~ Moderato 2009
 Tricks and Gimmicks
 Reiji Mitsurugi ~ Objection! 2009
 Confrontation ~ Allegro 2009
 Confess the Truth 2009
 Tricks and Baroque
 Confrontation ~ Presto 2009
 Pursuit ~ Lying Coldly
 Jingle ~ Slight Break
 Mikumo Ichijo ~ The Great Truth Burglar
 Shiryu Ro ~ Speak up, Pup!
 Yatagarasu ~ The Gentleman Thief Who Dances in the Black Night
 "Turnabout Airlines"
 Zinc White ~ Time is Money
 Wakana Shiraoto ~ Good Night
 Doubted People

 "Swept-Away Turnabout" ~ Overture to Kidnapping
 Taiho-kun March ~ Bando Land Theme
 "Swept-Away Turnabout" ~ Tragedy in the Horror House
 Noisy People
 Interesting People
 Reminiscence ~ False Relations
 Reproducing the Scene ~ The Gentleman Thief's Secret Weapon
 Court ~ Guardians of the Law
 "Departed Turnabout"
 Ittetsu Bado ~ The Truth isn't Sweet
 Himiko Kazura ~ Let Me Laugh at the Cool
 Reminiscence ~ KG-8 Case
 Crises of Fate
 Keisuke Itonokogiri ~ I can do it when it counts, pal!
 "Turnabout Up In Flames"
 Two Embassies ~ The Lands of the Butterfly and the Flower
 Reminiscence ~ Torn Apart Countries
 Carnage Onred ~ The Enemy Who Surpasses the Law
 Solution! ~ Splendid Deduction
 Reiji Mitsurugi ~ Great Revival 2009
 Prosecutor's Murmur ~ Promise to Meet Again

Gyakuten Kenji 2 Original Soundtrack

The Gyakuten Kenji 2 Original Soundtrack is a two-disc soundtrack album featuring background music from the video game Gyakuten Kenji 2 (unofficially referred to as Ace Attorney Investigations: Prosecutor's Path), sequel to Gyakuten Kenji.  The game's music was composed by Noriyuki Iwadare, composer of Trials and Tribulations and the first Ace Attorney Investigations.

 Gyakuten Kenji 2 ~ Prologue
 Investigation ~ Opening 2011
 Logic ~ Truth of the Crime Scene
 Trick Analyze
 Logic Chess ~ Opening
 Confrontation ~ Moderato 2011
 Reiji Mitsurugi ~ Objection! 2011
 Confess the Truth 2011
 Jingle ~ Neverending Trouble
 The Imprisoned Turnabout
 Investigation ~ Middlegame 2011
 Tateyuki Shigaraki ~ Joking Motive
 Yumihiko Ichiyanagi ~ Ichiryuu's Reasoning
 Confrontation ~ Allegro 2011
 Hakari Mikagami ~ Goddess of Law
 Prosecutorial Investigation Committee ~ Rigorous Justice
 Lamenting People
 Strange People
 Reproducing the Scene ~ The Gentleman Thief's Secret Weapon 2011
 Investigation ~ Core 2011
 Marie Miwa ~ Hug and Kiss
 Ryouken Houinbou ~ Tone of an Assassin
 Confrontation ~ Presto 2011
 Pursuit ~ Wanting to Find the Truth

 The Inherited Turnabout
 Shin Mitsurugi ~ A Defense Attorney's Knowledge
 Issei Tenkai ~ Sweet Happiness
 Restless People
 Reminiscence ~ IS-7 Incident
 Trick Break
 Tsukasa Oyashiki ~ Sweet Dance
 Yutaka Kazami ~ Brandished Flavor
 The Forgotten Turnabout
 Trifle of Fate
 Reminiscence ~ The Girl's Lost Memories
 Bonds ~ A Heart That Believes
 The Grand Turnabout
 Shimon Aizawa ~ Pointed Age
 The Great Monster Borumosu
 Reminiscence ~ The Fall of the House of Lang
 Logic Chess ~ Endgame
 Yumihiko Ichiyanagi ~ Ichiryuu's Farewell
 Ringtone ~ Hakari Mikagami
 Zheng Fa ~ Land of the Phoenix
 Reminiscence ~ SS-5 Incident
 The Man who Masterminds the Game
 Solution! ~ Calm Moment
 Prosecutor's Murmur ~ Each One's Path
 Gyakuten Kenji 2 ~ Great Revival

Gyakuten Saiban Sound BOX

The Gyakuten Saiban Sound BOX is a three-disc compilation soundtrack, containing the music from Gyakuten Saiban, Gyakuten Saiban 2, and Gyakuten Saiban 3 with enhanced sound quality. All music is directly from the WiiWare releases of each game.

Gyakuten Saiban (Disc One)
 Gyakuten Saiban - Prologue
 Courtroom Lounge ~ Beginning Prelude
 Gyakuten Saiban - Court Begins
 Cross Examination ~ Moderato 2001
 Logic and Trick
 Naruhodou Ryuuichi ~ Objection! 2001
 Cross Examination ~ Allegro 2001
 Pursuit ~ Cornered
 Confess the Truth 2001
 Suspense
 Pursuit ~ Cornered / Variation
 Jingle ~ It Can't End Here
 Investigation ~ Opening 2001
 Ayasato Mayoi ~ Gyakuten Sisters' Theme 2001
 Detention Center ~ Jailer's Elegy
 Itonokogiri Keisuke ~ Detective Itonoko, Pal
 Reminiscence ~ Heartbroken Mayoi
 Hoshikage Soranosuke ~ Age, Regret, Retribution
 Congratulations, Everyone
 Reminiscence ~ Light and Shadow of the Film Studio
 Warrior of Great Edo, Tonosaman
 Reminiscence ~ Case DL-6
 Investigation ~ Core 2001
 Reminiscence ~ School Trial
 Won the Case! ~ First Victory
 Gyakuten Saiban - End
 Gyakuten Sisters' Ballad
 Yomigaeru Gyakuten - Prologue
 Reminiscence ~ Case SL-9
 Houdzuki Akane ~ Gyakuten Sisters' Theme 2005
 Taiho-kun ~ I Want to Protect
 Zaimon Kyousuke ~ A Detective Without a Desert
 Ganto Kaiji ~ Swimming, Anyone?
 Yomigaeru Gyakuten - End

Gyakuten Saiban 2 (Disc Two)
 Gyakuten Saiban 2 - Prologue
 Ringtone / Moroheiya Takamasa
 Courtroom Lounge ~ Another Prelude
 Gyakuten Saiban 2 - Court Begins
 Cross Examination ~ Moderato 2002
 Trick and Magic
 Naruhodou Ryuuichi ~ Objection! 2002
 Cross Examination ~ Allegro 2002
 Pursuit ~ Questioned
 Confess the Truth 2002
 Ringtone / Naruhodou Ryuuichi
 Pursuit ~ Questioned / Variation
 Jingle ~ Can't Sleep on a Night Like This
 Lock on the Heart (Psycho Lock)
 Investigation ~ Opening 2002
 Ayasato Mayoi ~ Gyakuten Sisters' Theme 2002
 Detention Center ~ Security Camera Elegy
 Village of Kurain
 Reminiscence ~ Scars Carved by Fire
 Eccentric
 Gorgeous!
 Tachimi Circus
 Congratulations Again, Everyone.
 Reminiscence ~ True Pain
 Koroshiya Sazaemon ~ The Whim of a Murderous Gentleman
 Ayasato Harumi ~ With Hami-chan
 Investigation ~ Middle 2002
 Great Revival ~ Mitsurugi Reiji
 Hotline to Destiny
 Investigation ~ Core 2002
 Reminiscence ~ Tonosaman Ballad
 Great Revival ~ Karuma Mei
 Won the Case! ~ Another Victory
 Gyakuten Saiban 2 - End
 Prosecutor's Murmur ~ Until We Meet Again

Gyakuten Saiban 3 (Disc Three)
 Gyakuten Saiban 3 - Prologue
 Courtroom Lounge ~ Unending Prelude
 Gyakuten Saiban 3 - Court Begins
 Cross Examination ~ Moderato 2004
 Naruhodou Ryuuichi ~ Objection! 2004
 Cross Examination ~ Allegro 2004
 Pursuit ~ Caught
 Confess The Truth 2004
 Pursuit ~ Caught / Variation
 Miyanagi Chinami ~ Distant Traces
 Godot ~ The Fragrance of Dark Coffee
 Jingle ~ Can't Go Back to Those Days
 Investigation ~ Opening 2004
 "Stolen Turnabout"
 Takabisha Department Store
 Detention Center ~ Elegy of the Detained
 The Phantom Kamen Mask ~ Please Listen!
 Hoshiidake Aiga ~ I Just Want Love
 Yahari Masashi ~ When Something Smells, it's Always Me
 "Turnabout Recipe"
 Trés Bien
 Igarashi Shouhei ~ A Painful Declaration and War Song
 Shibakuzou Toranosuke ~ Swinging Zenitora
 Reminiscence ~ I Blame You
 "Beginning Turnabout."
 Reminiscence ~ Shadow on Oboro Bridge
 Hazakurain
 Tenryuusai Elise ~ Gentle Melody
 Investigation ~ Middle 2004
 Reminiscence ~ The Bitter Taste of Truth
 Pursuit ~ Cornered 2004
 Won the Case!  Unending Victory.
 Gyakuten Saiban 3 - End
 Ringtone / Godot

Gyakuten Saiban 5 Original Soundtrack

The Gyakuten Saiban 5 Soundtrack is a two-disc soundtrack featuring the background music from Gyakuten Saiban 5 (known internationally as Phoenix Wright: Ace Attorney - Dual Destinies). The game's music is composed by Noriyuki Iwadare, composer of Trials and Tribulations, Ace Attorney Investigations, and Ace Attorney Investigations 2.

 Gyakuten Saiban 5 - Prologue
 Courtroom Lobby ~ Prelude to the Future
 Gyakuten Saiban 5 - Court Begins
 Cross Examination ~ Moderato 2013
 Logic Trinity
 "The Depths of the Depths of the Heart"
 Naruhodou Ryuuichi ~ Objection! 2013
 "Odoroki Attacked"
 Cross Examination ~ Allegro 2013
 Suspense 2013
 Pursuit ~ Keep Pressing On
 Confess the Truth 2013
 "Breakaway"
 Jingle ~ You Should Rest at a Time Like This
 "Turnabout Youkai Parade"
 Kyuubi Village ~ Home of the Youkai
 Mysterious! The Legend of Tenma Tarou
 Go Forth! Great Kyuubi
 "The Murder Committed by a Youkai"
 Minuki's Theme ~ Child of Magic 2013
 Kizuki Kokone ~ Let's Do This!
 Ban Gouzou ~ Our Secret Word is Justice!
 Investigation ~ Opening 2013
 Detention Center ~ Elegy of the Bulletproof Glass
 Shuuichi Biyouin ~ I Am Biyouin
 "A Prosecutor with Handcuffs"
 Yuugami Jin ~ Distorted Swordsmanship
 Odoroki Housuke ~ A New Chapter of Trials 2013
 Thought Route ~ Synaptic Resonance
 "Turnabout Academy"
 Private School Themis Law School ~ Our Precious School
 "Kokone Will Take on Your Defense"
 Lively People
 Suspicious People
 Difficult People
 Housuke Odoroki ~ I’m Fine!
 Heart Scope ~ Commence the Psychological Analysis!
 Running Wild · Heart Scope ~ Get A Grip On Yourself
 "Proof of Friendship"
 Reminiscence ~ Wandering Heart
 Kizuki Kokone ~ Bringer of Revolution
 "Garyuu Wave · Twilight Gig"

 "Turnabout up to the Stars"
 Oogawara Uchuu ~ Head of the Center of the Universe
 Robot Laboratory ~ Unerasable Past
 "Turnabout to the Future"
 Investigation ~ Examination
 Ayasato Harumi ~ With Hami-chan 2013
 Chains of the Heart ~ Psyche-Lock 2013
 "A Magnificent Visitor"
 Mitsurugi Reiji ~ Great Revival 2013
 Reminiscence ~ Tragic Memories
 Investigation ~ Core 2013
 Illegality of Fate
 "For Those I Will Protect"
 The Dark Age of Law
 Phantom ~ UNKNOWN
 Pursuit ~ Keep Pressing On (Variation)
 Won the Case! ~ Everyone’s Victory
 Gyakuten Saiban 5 ~ End
 "Countdown to the Future"
 "Turnabout Great Pirates"
 Arafune Aquarium ~ A Refreshing Sea
 Pirate Sisters Ales ~ Adventures Across the Seven Seas
 "Pirate Show Song" ~ The Sea Of Adventure is Here
 "Pirate Show Song" ~ The Writer Who Snatches Away the Truth
 Reminiscence ~ Departure from Regret
 Pursuit ~ Demo PV version (Bonus Track)
 Pursuit ~ Last Promotion Version (Bonus Track)

Professor Layton vs. Gyakuten Saiban Magical Mystery Music

Professor Layton vs. Gyakuten Saiban Magical Mystery Music is a three-disc soundtrack album featuring music from the video game Professor Layton vs. Gyakuten Saiban (known internationally as Professor Layton vs. Phoenix Wright: Ace Attorney), a crossover between the Professor Layton and Ace Attorney video game series. The music was composed and arranged by Yasumasa Kitagawa and Professor Layton series composer Tomohito Nishiura; in addition to original compositions, the soundtrack features arrangements of tracks from Gyakuten Saiban originally composed by Masakazu Sugimori.

THE OPENING THEME OF "PROFESSOR LAYTON VS GYAKUTEN SAIBAN" 	
About Town ~ VS Arrange ver. 	
Puzzles 8 	
A Strange Story ~ VS Arrange ver.	
Labyrinth City 	
Pinch! ~ VS Arrange ver. 	
A Calm Afternoon ~ VS Arrange ver. 	
An Uneasy Atmosphere ~ VS Arrange ver. 	
Forest 	
Suspicion ~ VS Arrange ver. 	
The Lost Forest ~ VS Arrange ver. 	
Ink Workshop 	
Barrom 	
The Town's History ~ VS Arrange ver. 	
Professor Layton's Theme 1 ~ VS Arrange ver. 	
The City at Night 	
A Quiet Time ~ VS Arrange ver.	
Suspense ~ VS Arrange ver. 	
Mahoney's Theme ~ Memory 	
Puzzles 6 ~ VS Arrange ver. 	
Reunion 	
The Professor's Deductions ~ VS Arrange ver.	
LINK 	
The Buried Ruins 	
Audience	
Tension ~ VS Arrange ver. 	
The Storyteller's Tower 	
Puzzles 5 ~ VS Arrange ver. 	
The Hidden Garden 	

Courtroom Lobby ~ Beginning Overture 	
Gyakuten Saiban - Trial 	
Suspense 	
Logic and Trick	
Cross Examination ~ Moderato 	
Ryuuichi Naruhodou ~ Objection! 	
Cross-Examination ~ Allegro 	
Tell the Truth	
Pursuit ~Cornered 	
Victory! ~The First Victory 	
In the Dark ~The Witches' Overture 	
Witch Trial - Trial 	
The Stake's Witnesses 	
Jeeken Barnrod ~ Labyrinth Knight	
Mob Cross-Examination ~ Moderato 	
Logic and Baroque 	
Straying ~Suspense	
Ryuichi Naruhodo ~ Objection! 2012 	
Mob Cross-Examination ~ Allegro	
Tell the Truth 2012	
Theme of the United Front 	
The Courtroom's Magician	
Recollection ~ Bewitched Fate 	
Farce ~Naive People 	
Recollection ~ Golden Revelation	
Mist Belduke ~ Twilight Memories 	
The Great Witch's Judgment - Trial	
Omen ~Footfals of Turnabout 	
The Ruler and the Alchemist 	
Seal ~Locked-Away "Darkness" 	
Recollection ~ The Legendary Great Fire
Pursuit ~ Casting Magic	
The Final Witness	
Turnabout Sisters' Theme ~ Music Box ver.	

The Witches' Theme ~ Chase 	
RAINY NIGHT 	
In-Flight 	
OPENING	
The Witches' Theme ~ Assault 	
Escape 	
THE MAGIC BOOK 	
That Case	
The Storyteller's Theme ~ Parade 	
Judgment ~ Witch Trial	
A Mysterious Fire
The Bell Tower's Arrival 	
Sorrowful Golden Statue 	
Rescue and Retribution	
A Familiar Face 	
Into the Ruins 	
A Faint Voice	
Garyuu ~ Roar 	
Confrontation	
Confrontation ~ The Titanic Knights	
Professor Layton's Theme 2 ~ VS Arrange ver. 	
Festival	
Sealed Memories 	
Garyuu ~ Creation 	
Mahoney's Theme ~ Truth	
Lostoria!!	
The Light of the Truth	
PRELUDE 	
DENOUEMENT  	
THE ENDING THEME OF "PROFESSOR LAYTON VS GYAKUTEN SAIBAN"

Charts

Various
Noriyuki Iwadare has created two discs and has arranged two live performances that use tracks from the Ace Attorney series, but performed with instruments from multiple genres.

Gyakuten Meets Orchestra

Gyakuten Meets Orchestra is a soundtrack album featuring orchestral arrangements of background music from the first three entries in the Ace Attorney video game series, with one additional track from the as-of-then unreleased fourth entry.

 Naruhodou Ryuuichi - Objection!
 Ayasato Mayoi - Theme of Gyakuten Sisters
 Mitsurugi Reiji - Great Revival
 Investigation - Labyrinth Suite
 Gyakuten Saiban Court Suite
 Warrior of Great Edo, Tonosaman
 Gyakuten Saiban 2 Court Suite
 Godot - Fragrance of Dark Coffee
 Gyakuten Saiban 3 Court Suite
 Kurain Genealogy
 Gyakuten Saiban 3 Epilogue
 Odoroki Housuke - Start of a New Trial!

Gyakuten Meets Jazz Soul

Gyakuten Meets Jazz Soul (also known as Turnabout Jazz Soul) is a soundtrack album featuring jazz arrangements of background music from the first three entries in the Ace Attorney video game series, with one additional track from the as-of-then unreleased fourth entry.

 Gyakuten Saiban ~ Court Begins Blue note scale
 Naruhodou Ryuuichi ~ Objection!
 Warrior of Great Edo, Tonosaman
 Gyakuten Saiban 2 ~ Court Begins Blue note scale
 Mitsurugi Reiji - Great Revival
 Shibakuzou Toranosuke ~ Swinging Zenitora
 Gyakuten Saiban 3 ~ Court Begins Blue note scale
 Godot ~ The Fragrance of Dark Coffee
 Yomigaeru Gyakuten - End
 Minuki ~ Magical Child

Gyakuten Saiban Tokubetsu Hōtei 2008

 is a soundtrack album featuring background music from the video game series Ace Attorney that was performed live by the Tokyo Philharmonic Orchestra in spring. A DVD of this concert was released on October 30, 2008.

 Housuke Odoroki ~ A New Trial is in Session!
 Gyakuten Saiban 1~3 Courtroom Suite
 Toranosuke Shibakuzou ~ Swingin' Zenitora
 Godot ~ The Fragrance of Dark-Colored Coffee
 Great Revival ~ Reiji Mitsurugi
 Gyakuten Saiban 4 Courtroom Suite
 Villain Suite
 Loving Guitar's Serenade
 Mayoi Ayasato ~ Gyakuten Sisters' Theme
 Gyakuten Saiban 3 - End
 Oo-edo Soldier Tonosaman's Song
 Ryuuichi Naruhodou ~ Objection!

Gyakuten Saiban Tokubetsu Hōtei 2008 Autumn Commemorative

 is a soundtrack album featuring background music from the video game series Ace Attorney that was given to attendees of the autumn orchestral concert.

 Loving Guitar's Serenade
 Oo-edo Soldier Tonosaman's Song
 Ryuuichi Naruhodou ~ Objection! (Kanadeon ver.)
 Taiho-kun ~ I Want to Protect (Kanadeon ver.)

Gyakuten Kenji Orchestra Mini Album

Gyakuten Kenji Orchestra Mini Album is a soundtrack album featuring background music from and based on music from the Ace Attorney series related to the character Miles Edgeworth. The album was released with a special limited edition of Gyakuten Kenji.
 Mitsurugi Reiji ~ Great Revival 2009
 Testimony ~ Lying Coldly Full Orchestra Arrange
 Investigation Suite
 Taiho-kun ~ I Want to Protect
 Mitsurugi Reiji ~ Great Revival Kanadeon Version

Gyakuten Kenji 2 Orchestra Arrangement Collection

Gyakuten Kenji 2 Orchestra Arrangement Collection is a soundtrack album featuring background music from and based on music from the Ace Attorney series related to the character Miles Edgeworth, this time, from his second game as main character, Gyakuten Kenji 2. It consists of orchestral arrangements of various themes from the game's soundtrack. The album was released with a special limited edition of Gyakuten Kenji 2.
 Mitsurugi Reiji ~ Objection! 2011
 Mikumo Ichijo ~ The Great Truth Burglar 2011
 Gyakuten Kenji 2 Investigation Suite
 Gyakuten Kenji 2 Logic Suite
 Hakari Mikagami~ Goddess of Law
 Gyakuten Kenji 2 Confrontation Suite
 Pursuit ~ Wanting to Find the Truth
 Shin Mitsurugi ~ A Defense Attorney's Knowledge
 Bonds ~ A Heart that Believes
 Gyakuten Kenji 2 ~ Great Revival
 Opening ~ Gyakuten Kenji 2

Gyakuten Saiban Movie Original Soundtrack

Gyakuten Saiban Original Movie Soundtrack is a soundtrack album featuring the music from the theatrical movie Gyakuten Saiban.
Gyakuten Saiban - Trial (Cinema Ver.)
Ryuichi Naruhodo ~ Objection 2001 (Cinema Ver.)
Cross Examination ~ Allegro 2001 (Cinema Ver.)
Negligence
Attachment Order
Breaking Into a Residence
Imprisonment With Work
Aggravated Escape
Suspension of Execution of the Sentence
Necessary Measure
Evidence 
Testify Associate Judge
Upper Instance Court
Kidnapping
Attempts
Youth
General Period for Payment
Investigation ~ Core 2001 (Cinema Ver.)
Mayoi Ayasato ~ Turnabout Sisters Theme 2001 (Diva Ver.)
Pursuit ~ Cornered (Cinema Ver.)
Fine
Article 30
Neighboring Right
Acceptance of Stolen Property
Robbery
Insults
Gambling
Arson of Inhabited Buildings
Theft
Obstruction to Flood Prevention
Unjust Enrichment
Fanfare
BWV245 (BACH)
Oo-edo Soldier Tonosaman (Cinema Ver.)
Mayoi Ayasato ~ Turnabout Sisters Theme 2001 (Choir Ver.)

Gyakuten Saiban 15th Anniversary Orchestra Concert

Gyakuten Saiban 15th Anniversary Orchestra Concert is a soundtrack album consisting of 13 tracks of music from the Ace Attorney series arranged for orchestra. The recordings are taken from the concert celebrating the 15th anniversary of the series held at the Tokyo Bunka Kaikan on May 6, 2017 and performed live by the Tokyo Philharmonic Orchestra.

Notes

References

External links
Tanomi.com
法廷バトルの興奮をギッシリ収録！　『逆転裁判4』のオリジナルサウンドトラックが発売 / ファミ通.com

Music
Video game music discographies
Music by video game franchise